Burakabad or Burkabad may refer to:
 Burkabad, Ardabil
 Burakabad, Kermanshah